The James Lorin Richards House is an historic house and carriage barn in Newton, Massachusetts.  The house is located at 47 Kirkstall Road and the carriage barn, which has been converted to a residence, is at 22 Oakwood Road.  The high-style Shingle buildings were designed by Samuel J. Brown and built in 1901 for James Lorin Richards, a successful businessman who made his fortune in tobacco, and was heavily involved in Boston-area electric companies.  He also served as president of Norumbega Park, a major early-20th century amusement park in Newton.

The house and barn were listed on the National Register of Historic Places in 1986.

See also
 National Register of Historic Places listings in Newton, Massachusetts

References

Houses on the National Register of Historic Places in Newton, Massachusetts
Queen Anne architecture in Massachusetts
Houses completed in 1901
Shingle Style houses
Shingle Style architecture in Massachusetts